Poincaré is a French surname. Notable people with the surname include:

 Henri Poincaré (1854–1912), French physicist, mathematician and philosopher of science
 Henriette Poincaré (1858-1943), wife of Prime Minister Raymond Poincaré
 Lucien Poincaré (1862–1920), physicist, brother of Raymond and cousin of Henri
 Raymond Poincaré (1860–1934),  French Prime Minister or President inter alia from 1913 to 1920, cousin of Henri

See also

List of things named after Henri Poincaré.

French-language surnames